Ford Bay Airport  is a private aerodrome at Ford Bay, Great Bear Lake Northwest Territories, Canada. Prior permission is required to land except in the case of an emergency.

See also
Ford Bay Water Aerodrome

References

Registered aerodromes in the Sahtu Region